John Searl Howell (December 4, 1915 – June 28, 1946) was a halfback in the National Football League.

Biography
Howell was born on December 4, 1915 in Omaha, Nebraska. He was struck and killed by lightning on June 28, 1946 in Scottsbluff, Nebraska.

Career
Howell was drafted by the Green Bay Packers in the ninth round of the 1938 NFL Draft and played that season with the team. He played at the collegiate level at the University of Nebraska-Lincoln.

See also
List of Green Bay Packers players

References

Sportspeople from Omaha, Nebraska
Green Bay Packers players
American football halfbacks
Nebraska Cornhuskers football players
Players of American football from Nebraska
1915 births
1946 deaths
Deaths from lightning strikes